Mark Ernest Barber (May 19, 1915 – February 24, 1975) was an American football player who spent one year in the National Football League.

External links
 

1915 births
American football fullbacks
Cleveland Rams players
South Dakota State Jackrabbits football players
1975 deaths
Place of birth missing